The 1951–52 Scottish Division A was won by Hibernian by four points over nearest rival Rangers. Greenock Morton and Stirling Albion finished 15th and 16th respectively and were relegated to the 1952–53 Scottish Division B.

League table

Results

References

Scottish Football Archive

1951–52 Scottish Football League
Scottish Division One seasons
Scot